Pergolini is a surname. Notable people with the surname include: 

Gia Pergolini (born 2004), American Paralympic swimmer
Mario Pergolini (born 1964), Argentine journalist, media producer and businessman

Italian-language surnames